TI Fluid Systems is a British multinational company which develops, manufactures and supplies automotive fluid storage, carrying and delivery systems. The company serves the automotive aftermarket through Bundy, Walbro and Marwal brands. The company's headquarters are located in Oxford, England, with Corporate Offices based in Auburn Hills, Michigan, U.S. It is listed on the London Stock Exchange and is a constituent of the FTSE 250 Index.

History
The company traces its history back to the Bundy Corporation, which was founded in 1922 and supplied petroleum fuel lines to the Ford Model T. It was acquired by TI Group plc in 1988. After Smiths Group acquired TI Group in 2000, Smiths Group transferred its newly acquired automotive business into a corporate entity in 2001 thereby creating TI Automotive.

In 2007, the company was acquired by a consortium of private equity investors. The company was forced to go through a debt-to-equity swap in 2009 following the global economic downturn.

William "Bill" L. Kozyra was named chairman, chief executive officer and president of TI Automotive in May 2008.

In January 2015, the company was acquired by Bain Capital for $2.4 billion.

In October 2017, the company floated on the London Stock Exchange under its new name of TI Fluid Systems. The company floated 25 per cent of its shares.

Structure
The company has two divisions: fuel tank systems and fluid carrying systems (such as brakes, battery cooling and climate control).

References

External links
 Official website

Engineering companies of the United States
Manufacturing companies based in Michigan
Auburn Hills, Michigan
Manufacturing companies established in 2000
2000 establishments in Michigan